Song Si-yeol (30 December 1607 - 19 July 1689), also known by his pennames Uam (우암) and Ujae (우재) or by the honorific Master Song, was a Korean philosopher and politician. Born in Okcheon, North Chungcheong, he was known for his concern with the problems of the common people.  He served in governmental service for more than fifty years, and his name features over 3,000 times in the Annals of Joseon Dynasty, the greatest frequency that any individual is mentioned. He was executed by the royal court for writing an inflammatory letter to the king.
There is a monument to him in his hometown.
He is also known as the calligrapher who inscribed an epitaph (Chungyeolmyobi Takboncheop) in dedication of Admiral Yi Sunsin, which is preserved at the Chungnyeolsa Shrine (historical site No. 236). He was from the Eunjin Song clan.

Family 

 Grandfather
 Song Eung-gi (송응기, 宋應期)
 Grandmother
 Lady Lee (이씨, 李氏)
 Father
 Song Gab-jo (송갑조, 宋甲祚) (1573 - April 1628)
 Mother
 Lady Gwak of the Seonsan Gwak clan (증 정경부인 선산 곽씨) (? - March 1655)
 Wife and children
 Lady Yi of the Hansan Yi clan (정경부인 한산 이씨, 韓山李氏) (? - March 1677)
 Son - Song Sun (송순, 宋純)
 Son - Song Hoe (송회, 宋懷)
 Son - Song Seok (송석, 宋惜)
 Daughter - Lady Song of the Eunjin Song clan (은진 송씨, 恩津 宋氏)
 Son-in-law - Kwon Yu (권유, 權愈) of the Andong Kwon clan (안동 권씨)
 Daughter - Lady Song of the Eunjin Song clan (은진 송씨, 恩津 宋氏)
 Son-in-law - Yun Baek (윤박, 尹博) of the Paepyeong Yun clan (파평 윤씨); nephew of Yun Seon-geo (윤선거)
 Adoptive son - Song Gi-tae (송기태, 宋基泰) (1629 - 1711); son of Song Si-hyeong (송시형, 宋時瑩)
 Adoptive daughter-in-law - Lady Yi of the Jeonju Yi clan (증 정부인 전주 이씨)

Works
 Uam jip (우암집, 尤庵集)
 Uam seonsang hujip (우암선생후집, 尤菴先生後集)
 Uam yugo (우암유고, 尤菴遺稿)
 Juja daejeon (주자대전잡억)
 Songseo seubyu (송서습유, 宋書拾遺)
 Songseo sok seubyu (송서속습유, 宋書續拾遺)
 Juja daejeonchaui (주자대전차의, 朱子大全箚疑)
 Jeongseobullyu (정서분류, 程書分類)
 Juja eoryusobun (주자어류소분, 朱子語類小分)
 Nonmaeng munuitonggo (논맹문의통고, 論孟問義通攷)
 Simgyeong seogui (심경석의, 心經釋義)
 Sambang chwaryo (삼방촬요, 三方撮要)
 Songja daejeon (송자대전, 宋子大全)
 Jangneungjimun (장릉지문, 長陵誌文)
 Yeongneungjimun (영릉지문, 寧陵誌文)
 Song Jungil myojimyeong (송준길묘지명)
 Sagyeseonsaenghaengjang (사계선생행장, 沙溪先生行狀)

In popular culture
 He was portrayed by Ahn Hyung-shik in the 1981 KBS1 TV Series Daemyeong.

See also

List of Korean philosophers
Korean philosophy
Heo Mok
Yun Hyu
Yun Seondo
Yun Jeung
Gim Jip
Gim Jangsaeng

Song Jungil
Yun Seongeo
Gwon Sangha
Gim Seokju

References

External links 

 Song Siyeol 
 Uam Academic institutions  
 Song Siyeol:Naver 
 Song Siyeol:Navercast 

1607 births
1689 deaths
17th-century Korean philosophers
17th-century politicians
Joseon scholar-officials
Korean Confucianists
Korean scholars
Eunjin Song clan